This article lists bicycle part manufacturers and brands past and present. For a list of bicycle manufacturers, see list of bicycle manufacturers.

0-9
3T Cycling

A
Atala (company)
Avid- owned by SRAM Corporation

B
Baisikeli Ugunduzi
Bell Sports Inc.
Bike Arc
Bontrager
Brooks Saddle
Burley Design
Bianchi

C
Campagnolo
Centurion
Cheng Shin Rubber (also branded as Maxxis and CST)
Cinelli
Coker Tire
Continental
Cannondale Bicycle Corporation

D

E
Easton

F
Fox Racing Shox
Fulcrum Wheels

G
Gates Corporation
Giro
Giant Bicycles

H
Haro Bikes
Hutchinson Tires

I
Ingersoll-Rand, manufacturer of Kryptonite locks
Inoue Rubber Co., Ltd., manufacturer of IRC Tires

J

K
Kenda Rubber Industrial Company - Taiwan
Kinesis Industry - Taiwan
KMC Chain - Taiwan
Kuota - Italy

L

M
 Mafac
 Magura GmbH
 Marzocchi
 Mavic
 Maxxis
 Merida Bikes
 Michelin
 Mongoose

N
Nokian

O

P
Panaracer - owned by the Panasonic Corporation
Planet X Limited
Procons Oy Ab

Q
Quality Bicycle Products

R
 Raleigh Bicycle Company
 Reynolds Technology
 Ridley
 Tom Ritchey
 RockShox – owned by SRAM Corporation
 Rohloff AG

S
Sachs
Schwalbe
Shimano
Specialized Bicycle Components
Speedplay
SRAM
Sturmey Archer
SunTour
Sugino
Santa Cruz

T
Trek Bicycle Corporation
Truvativ- owned by SRAM Corporation
Tube India
Thomson

U

V
Vittoria
Vredestein

W
Wilderness Trail Bikes
Wippermann

X
Xtracycle

Y

Z
Zipp- owned by SRAM Corporation

See also
List of bicycle manufacturers
 Outline of cycling

References

Bicycle part manufacturing companies
bicycle part

ja:自転車メーカー一覧